Andre Reeves Jr. (born June 4, 1999) is an American professional basketball player for the Maine Celtics of the NBA G League. He played college basketball for the Providence Friars of the Big East Conference.

High school career
Reeves attended Brimmer and May School in Chestnut Hill, Massachusetts. He was a First Team All-New England Prep School Athletic Council honoree as a junior. As a senior, Reeves averaged 27.9 points, 9.1 rebounds, 5.2 assists and 2.1 steals per game. He was named Gatorade Massachusetts player of the year. Regarded as a four-star recruit, he was ranked the 55th best player in his class and the 6th best shooting guard by ESPN. On June 25, 2017, Reeves committed to playing college basketball for Providence, choosing the Friars over Louisville, Villanova, and Virginia.

College career
In his freshman debut, Reeves scored 29 points in a 77–67 win over Siena, setting the Providence record for most points in a game by a freshman in their first game. He was named Big East Freshman of the Week three times in the first month of the season, but was hampered by a foot injury suffered in December 2018 which kept him sidelined for several weeks. As a freshman, Reeves averaged 9.8 points and 3 rebounds per game. Reeves struggled with his shooting during his sophomore season and sought out a sports psychologist. He averaged 7.4 points and 3.1 rebounds per game as a sophomore and made 16 starts. As a junior, Reeves averaged 9.6 points, 3.6 rebounds and 1.7 assists per game, shooting 35.3% from the floor. In the offseason, he transformed his diet to lose 20 pounds. On January 1, 2022, Reeves sustained an injury to a finger on his non-shooting hand in a win against DePaul, forcing him to miss several games. As a senior, Reeves averaged 9.9 points and 2.8 rebounds per game, shooting 37.3% from three-point range.

Professional career
Reeves signed an Exhibit 10 deal with the Boston Celtics in October 2022, and began the season with the G League affiliate the Maine Celtics.

National team career
Reeves represented the United States at the 2019 Pan American Games in Peru, helping his team win the bronze medal.

Career statistics

College

|-
| style="text-align:left;"| 2018–19
| style="text-align:left;"| Providence
| 25 || 21 || 22.7 || .423 || .381 || .705 || 3.0 || .6 || 1.0 || .1 || 9.8
|-
| style="text-align:left;"| 2019–20
| style="text-align:left;"| Providence
| 28 || 16 || 21.9 || .374 || .342 || .667 || 3.1 || 1.2 || .8 || .2 || 7.4
|-
| style="text-align:left;"| 2020–21
| style="text-align:left;"| Providence
| 26 || 26 || 31.5 || .353 || .320 || .846 || 3.6 || 1.7 || 1.0 || .1 || 9.6
|-
| style="text-align:left;"| 2021–22
| style="text-align:left;"| Providence
| 28 || 25 || 25.3 || .369 || .373 || .787 || 2.8 || 2.0 || .4 || .2 || 9.9
|- class="sortbottom"
| style="text-align:center;" colspan="2"| Career
| 107 || 88 || 25.3 || .378 || .354 || .758 || 3.1 || 1.4 || .8 || .1 || 9.1

References

External links
Providence Friars bio

1999 births
Living people
American men's basketball players
Basketball players from Boston
Basketball players at the 2019 Pan American Games
Maine Celtics players
Medalists at the 2019 Pan American Games
Pan American Games bronze medalists for the United States
Pan American Games medalists in basketball
Providence Friars men's basketball players
Shooting guards